Sciensus (formerly Healthcare at Home) is a pharmaceutical supplier established in 1992 by founder and former chairman Charles Walsh based in Burton on Trent.

The company supplies a wide range of pharmaceuticals and home healthcare with around 1,600 employees dealing with more than 230,000 patients a year.  It works with every NHS trust in the UK.

In Spring 2015, Healthcare at Home reverted to using in house logistics rather than working with a third party for all deliveries. 

In Autumn 2015, the company went through a full corporate rebranding, including new logos, literature, strap line and website in an attempt to re-establish the company's status in the market.

The company's name was changed in 2022 from "Healthcare at Home LTD" to "Sciensus Pharma Limited", using only "Sciensus" to refer to themselves from then on.

History 
In 2013 Healthcare at Home took over almost 3,000 patients from another drug delivery company, Medco Health Solutions which pulled out of the UK market.  Subsequently the company struggled to maintain services.  In March 2014 Healthcare at Home said that it was no longer accepting new ‘high risk’ patients such as those suffering from haemophilia or respiratory diseases like cystic fibrosis because it could not guarantee getting their drugs to them on time or in full.  The company blamed IT issues and a ‘system failure’ relating to the firm’s outsourcing of its logistics and warehousing departments.  Dave Roberts, chief executive of the National Clinical Homecare Association, says there are questions about whether the rapid growth and low profit margins in the sector have contributed to the situation. ‘There’s been 20% growth in this sector year on year for several years now in terms of numbers of patients – that’s a very rapid expansion. But profits in this sector are just 2-4%. That is a poor return given the extent of capital investment needed and the governance and logistics issues. As NHS budgets have fallen, all the slack has been cut out of contracts,’ Roberts added.

In its 2014 accounts Healthcare at Home, which is majority-owned by private equity firm Vitruvian Partners, reported a turnover of £1bn, with pretax profits of just £15m. 

The chief executive Mike Gordon stepped down in June 2014 after the revelation that seven per cent of the firm’s 150,000 patients had not received their medication on time or in full during the last six months.

In May 2021 it was reported that the firm had missed almost 10,000 medicine deliveries when it introduced a new IT system in October 2020 and it was put in special measures by the Care Quality Commission.  The inspectors found they failed to properly investigate some health and safety incidents and "did not always learn lessons when things went wrong".

References

Private providers of NHS services
Pharmaceutical companies of the United Kingdom
Companies based in Staffordshire
Health care companies of England